Whip Media Group is a private American company selling enterprise software for content distribution, as well as TV- and film-related user data. It operates physical offices in the US, the UK, and the EU.

Background
Whip Media Group is the result of a merger of TV Time, a tracking platform for user data about TV shows and films, and Mediamorph, a data tracking and content distribution company operating in the video on demand market. It was founded following the former's acquisition of the latter in October 2019. As of its founding its CEO was Richard Rosenblatt.

Whip Media Group also operates TheTVDB, a user-generated TV show database. 

As of January 2020 the company employed 155 people.

Funding
In January 2020 Whip Media raised $50 million from Eminence Capital and Raine Ventures. Making the total amount of money raised by the company to $115 million at time of this deal.

References 

American companies established in 2019
Technology companies based in Greater Los Angeles